Wiener–Lévy theorem is a theorem in Fourier analysis, which states that a function of an absolutely convergent Fourier series has an absolutely convergent Fourier series under some conditions. The theorem was named after Norbert Wiener and Paul Lévy.

Norbert Wiener first proved Wiener's 1/f theorem, see Wiener's theorem. It states that if  has absolutely convergent Fourier series and is never zero, then its inverse  also has an absolutely convergent Fourier series.

Wiener–Levy theorem

Paul Levy generalized Wiener's result, showing that

Let  be an absolutely convergent Fourier series with

 

Then  has an absolutely convergent Fourier series.

The proof can be found in the Zygmund's classic book Trigonometric Series.

Example
Let  and ) is characteristic function of discrete probability distribution.  So  is an absolutely convergent Fourier series. If  has no zeros, then we have

where 

The statistical application of this example can be found in discrete pseudo compound Poisson distribution and zero-inflated model.

Then  is said to have the discrete pseudo compound Poisson distribution, abbreviated DPCP.

See also

 Wiener's theorem (disambiguation)

References

Theorems in Fourier analysis